The Men's 200m T38 had its First Round held on September 13 at 9:30 and the Final on September 14 at 18:03.

Medalists

Results

References
Round 1 - Heat 1
Round 1 - Heat 2
Final

Athletics at the 2008 Summer Paralympics